Meranda is a genus of moths of the family Noctuidae. The genus was erected by Francis Walker in 1866.

Species
 Meranda gilviceps Turner, 1908
 Meranda holochrysa Meyrick, 1902
 Meranda susialis Walker, 1859

References

Calpinae
Moth genera